Chad Valley may refer to:

 Chad Valley (toy brand), a brand of toys in the United Kingdom
 Chad Valley, Birmingham, an area of Birmingham, UK
 Chad Valley (musician), a recording artist from the UK